El Producto may refer to:

El-Producto or El-P, stage name of Jaime Meline  an American rapper and hip-hop producer
El Producto (Walt Mink album)
El Producto (EP), a 1997 EP by Australian dance band The Avalanches